Roberto Estalella Ventoza [es-tah-LAY-yah] (April 25, 1911 – January 6, 1991) was a Cuban professional baseball outfielder and third baseman, who played in Major League Baseball (MLB) for the Washington Senators (–,  and ), St. Louis Browns, and Philadelphia Athletics (– and ). He was selected to represent the American League (AL) in the ill-fated 1945 Major League Baseball All-Star Game, which was scheduled for July 10 at Fenway Park but never played because of World War II restrictions on civilian domestic travel.

Early life
Born in Cárdenas, Matanzas, Cuba, Estalella earned the nickname "Tarzan" by his medium-frame, stocky and compact body.

Professional career
Estalella's organized baseball career began in the minor leagues in 1934. After two brief trials with the 1935–1936 Senators, Estalella led the Class B Piedmont League in home runs (33) and batting average (.349) in 1937, and in 1938 he won the circuit's Triple Crown, pacing the Piedmont League in batting (.378), homers (38) and runs batted in (123), as well as in hits (180) and runs scored (134). After that, he returned to the American League to spend full or partial seasons with the Senators (1939 and 1942) and Browns (1941). He was sent to the Athletics in 1943 in the same trade that brought All-Star outfielder "Indian Bob" Johnson to Washington.

He would have played many more years, but he was one of the players suspended by Commissioner Happy Chandler in 1946 for jumping to the outlaw Mexican League. Chandler mentioned a lifetime suspension for them, but when the penalty was reduced in 1949, Estalella came back to the majors.

Although Estalella vigorously denied it during his life, several current baseball writers now consider him to have been the first player of some African ancestry to have played in the Major Leagues in the 20th century.

Career stats
In the major leagues, Estalella was a career .282 hitter with 44 home runs and 308 RBI in 680 games played. His 620 MLB hits included 106 doubles and 33 triples. He also compiled a respectable 1.423 walk-to-strikeout ratio (350-to-246) and a .383 on-base percentage. He led AL centerfielders in fielding percentage in both 1944 (.993) and 1945 (.990).

Personal

Bobby Estalella died in Hialeah, Florida at the age of 79.

See also

List of Major League Baseball players from Cuba
List of Cubans

References

External links

Bobby Estalella at SABR (Baseball BioProject)
Before El Duque There was Luque and Before Robinson There was Estalella

1911 births
1991 deaths
Albany Senators players
American League All-Stars
Azules de Veracruz players
Charlotte Hornets (baseball) players
Chattanooga Lookouts players
Harrisburg Senators players
Havana Cubans players
Major League Baseball outfielders
Major League Baseball players from Cuba
Cuban expatriate baseball players in the United States
Major League Baseball third basemen
Minneapolis Millers (baseball) players
Philadelphia Athletics players
St. Jean Braves players
St. Louis Browns players
San Antonio Missions players
Toledo Mud Hens players
Tuneros de San Luis Potosí players
Washington Senators (1901–1960) players
People from Cárdenas, Cuba